Roberto Ezequiel Floris (5 January 1986 in Santa Rosa, La Pampa) is an Argentine footballer. He currently plays for Barracas Central for Primera B Metropolitana in Argentina.

External links
 BDFA profile 
 Argentine Primera statistics at Fútbol XXI  
 

1986 births
Living people
People from Santa Rosa, La Pampa
Argentine footballers
Association football defenders
Club Atlético Vélez Sarsfield footballers
Everton de Viña del Mar footballers
San Martín de San Juan footballers
Argentine Primera División players
Argentine expatriate footballers
Expatriate footballers in Chile